Aguarico Canton is a canton of Ecuador, located in the Orellana Province.  Its capital is the town of Nuevo Rocafuerte.  Its population at the 2010 census was 4,658 INEC 2010.

Aguarico is part of the Cuyabeno Natural Reserve and Yasuni National Park.

History
Aguarico dates from the late nineteenth century during an estate boom on the banks of the Napo River in the Amazon region.  During the invasion of Peru in Ecuador in 1941, Rocafuerte was taken by the Peruvian army after defeating the Ecuadorian military garrison on 11 August of that year. Following the armed conflict, almost all rubber plantations were abandoned.

On 22 February 1945, by order of President Jose Maria Velasco Ibarra, the town of Nuevo Rocafuerte officially became the new county seat of the Canton of Aguarico.

Parishes
 Nuevo Rocafuerte
 Cononaco
 Tiputini
 Yasuní
 Santa María Huiririma 
 Capitán Augusto Rivadeneira.

Demographics 
Ethnic groups as of the Ecuadorian census of 2010:
Indigenous  77.4%
Mestizo  20.1%
Afro-Ecuadorian  1.4%
White  0.8%
Montubio  0.1%
Other  0.1%

Places of interest 
 Cuyabeno Wildlife Reserve

References

External links
Official site

Cantons of Orellana Province